Pascal William Clutterbuck (born November 18, 1987) is a Canadian professional ice hockey right winger and alternate captain for the New York Islanders of the National Hockey League (NHL). Clutterbuck was drafted 72nd overall by the Minnesota Wild in the 2006 NHL Entry Draft.

Early life 
Clutterbuck was born on November 18, 1987, in Welland, Ontario, to Tim and Jocelyne Clutterbuck. He was around the same age as many other future National Hockey League (NHL) players from the Welland area, and is remembered in his hometown as one of the "Welland Five", a group that also consists of Matt Ellis, Daniel Paille, Dan Girardi, and Paul Bissonnette. Bissonnette remembered Clutterbuck as a "dominant scorer" in Welland youth hockey who only became more physical and focused on checking his opponents when he was older. Clutterbuck played a variety of sports, including baseball, golf, and volleyball, but began focusing solely on hockey when he was around the age of 16. While attending Notre Dame College School, Clutterbuck also played junior ice hockey for the Welland Cougars of the Golden Horseshoe Junior Hockey League.

Playing career

Junior
The Toronto St. Michael's Majors of the Ontario Hockey League (OHL) drafted Clutterbuck in the first round, 13th overall, of the 2003 OHL Priority Selection. He joined the team for the 2003–04 OHL season, scoring his first goal of the year on November 23 in a 5–2 defeat of the Sudbury Wolves.

He was drafted by the Minnesota Wild 72nd overall in the third round of the 2006 NHL Entry Draft.

Professional

Minnesota Wild

Clutterbuck signed a three-year, entry-level contract with the Wild on May 31, 2007. He was assigned to the Wild's American Hockey League  (AHL) affiliate, the Houston Aeros, to start the 2007–08 season. He was recalled to the Wild on October 23, 2007, after an injury to Pavol Demitra, and played his first NHL game on October 28, 2007 against the Colorado Avalanche.

In the early months of the 2008–09 Aeros season, Clutterbuck was again called up to play with the Wild. He instantly became a fan favorite and did not return to the Aeros, playing in 78 games with the Wild. On November 24, 2008, he scored his first NHL goal against José Théodore of the Washington Capitals, scoring two goals in the game. Clutterbuck broke the NHL record for hits in the 2008–09 season with 356, in a game against the New York Islanders. The previous record was 311, set by Dustin Brown of the Los Angeles Kings. The record was broken in 2012 by Matt Martin, a future teammate of his on the Islanders.

New York Islanders
On June 30, 2013, during the 2013 NHL Entry Draft, Clutterbuck, as a restricted free agent, was traded from the Wild to the Islanders along with a third-round draft pick in exchange for forward Nino Niederreiter. During the 2014–15 season, Clutterbuck was named as an alternate captain for the team after Kyle Okposo was sidelined with an eye injury.

On April 25, 2015, Clutterbuck scored, what would later become the last goal in Nassau Veterans Memorial Coliseum history (until the Islanders announced a part-time return to the Coliseum starting with the 2018–19 season) into an empty net with 0:53 remaining in the third period as the Islanders won Game 6 of their first-round playoff series against the Capitals, 3–1, to extend the series to a seventh game. The Islanders would eventually lose Game 7 to the Capitals two nights later.

The following season, Clutterbuck's line, consisting of himself, Casey Cizikas and Matt Martin was considered to be the best fourth line in the NHL by some hockey analysts. He signed a five-year contract with the Islanders on December 9, 2016.

In the  season, while in the final season of his five-year contract, with the Islanders out of playoff contention, Clutterbuck at NHL trade deadline opted to re-sign to a two-year, $3.5 million contract extension with the team on March 21, 2022. Having appeared in 59 regular season games, totalling 6 goals and 15 points, Clutterbuck was announced to undergo season-ending shoulder surgery on March 24, 2022.

Career statistics

Regular season and playoffs

International

References

External links
 

1987 births
Living people
Bridgeport Sound Tigers players
Canadian ice hockey right wingers
Houston Aeros (1994–2013) players
Sportspeople from Welland
Minnesota Wild draft picks
Minnesota Wild players
New York Islanders players
Ice hockey people from Ontario
Oshawa Generals players
Toronto St. Michael's Majors players